Jim Sypult (September 21, 1945 - January 8, 2018) was an American football player and coach.  He served as the head football coach at Methodist University in Fayetteville, North Carolina from 1992 to 2010, compiling a record of 88–101.  Sypult was the second coach in the program's history and won the team's first conference championship, in 2005.

Head coaching record

References

1945 births
2018 deaths
Davidson Wildcats football coaches
Methodist Monarchs football coaches
Middle Tennessee Blue Raiders football coaches
Fairmont State Fighting Falcons football coaches
West Virginia Mountaineers football coaches
West Virginia Mountaineers football players
Sportspeople from Fairmont, West Virginia
Players of American football from West Virginia